Johann Gaudenz Gubert Graf (and Freiherr) von Salis-Seewis (26 December 1762 – 29 January 1834) was a Swiss poet, writer, politician and librettist.

Life 
Salis-Seewis was born in Malans, and came from an old Swiss aristocracy. His father, baron Johann Ulrich von Salis-Seewis (1740–1815), was created a (primogenitive) Comte (count) at Versailles on 1 February 1777 having married Freiin Jakobea von Salis-Bothmar (1741–1791) in 1760. The Reichs-freiherrdom dated back to 20 January 1588, for Dietegan v. Salis.

Between 1779 and 1789 Salis served as an officer in the Swiss Guards in France in Paris, France, until the French revolution made him quit. Salis-Seewis was one of the favourites of Marie Antoinette. In the next year Salis-Seewis undertook a journey to the Netherlands and Germany (including Weimar), meeting Goethe, Herder, Schiller, Wieland, and Matthisson. He particularly connected with Matthisson, and an intimate friendship developed.

The poet colleagues shared a sense of Sturm und Drang and empathy, calling it the "Bündner Nachtigall" (Graubünden nightingale). Salis-Seewis returned to Switzerland in 1791, living in Chur and marrying there, on 26 December 1793, the 22-year-old Ursina v. Pestalozzi (Chur 29 September 1771 - Malans 27 June 1835). They had two sons; Johann-Ulrich Dietegan (Comte) v. Salis-Seewis (1794–1844) and Johann-Jakob (Freiherr) v. Salis-Seewis (1800–1881). He had a lively involvement in the political changes in his homeland over the next years lively involved, endorsed the alliance of the Three Leagues of Switzerland to the new France, and the proclaimed Helvetic Republic. After the area was occupied by Austria in the following year, Salis-Seewis and his family had to flee to Zurich. There, he was appointed inspector general of the Helvetican troops. This activity brought him the nickname "poet general". He later went to Bern and received a place on the  Court of cassation. When the Act of Mediation was issued by Napoleon Bonaparte in 1803, it became possible for Salis-Seewis to return to Graubünden. There he held several public offices until 1817, then he withdrew as Swiss federal colonel. His father had died two years before.

Artistic work 

Salis-Seewis and Matthisson had similar writing styles, both being inclined to write about natural topics, and about their homeland. The poems of Salis Seewis are characterised however by more masculinity, freshness, popularity as well as a deeper sense of yearning. His elegies have always had a firm and determining reason. Done with the revolutionary thoughts of the French revolution, he was a progressive representative of human rights and separated from the conservative, oligarchic tradition of his family, which controlled the Three Leagues unquestioned over decades. He died in Malans.

Franz Schubert has set many poems of Salis-Seewis to music, like Abschied von der Harfe, Das Grab or Zum Rundtanz. His best known work is the Herbstlied, written in 1782, set to music in 1799 by Johann Friedrich Reichardt.

References

Sources 
 
  Laura Mancinelli: Il canto di un contadino in terra straniera: ritratto di J. Gaudenz von Salis-Seewis, Cenobio 1958.
 Christian Erni: Von Paris nach Weimar. Johann Gaudenz von Salis-Seewis in der Französischen Revolution auf Urlaubsreise nach Weimar 1789-1790. In: Jahrbuch der Historischen Gesellschaft von Graubünden. 1995.
 Hans Peter Gansner: Der Dichter-General. Eine dramatische Biographie des J. G. von Salis-Seewis. Mit einem Essay des Authors über J. G. von Salis-Seewis und Ferdinand Freiligrath sowie einigen Nachbemerkungen. Calven, Chur 2003. 
 Johann Gaudenz von Salis–Seewis und Johann Heinrich Füßli in ihren Briefen, hrsg. v. Felix Humm. Huber, Bern u.a. 1976.
 Emil Jenal: Johann Gaudenz v.Salis-Seewis und die eidgenössische Wiedergeburt. Schuler, Chur 1924.
 Alfred Rufer: Johann Gaudenz v. Salis–Seewis als Bündner Patriot und Helvetischer Generalstab. Bischofberger, Chur 1938.
 Johann Ulrich Schlegel: Die Beziehungen zwischen Johann Gaudenz von Salis und Ignaz Heinrich von Wessenberg. Juris, Zürich 1976. 
 Walter Zindel-Kuoni: Johann Gaudenz von Salis-Seewis. Landschaft seiner Lieder und Geschichte seiner Zeit. Desertina, Chur 2006.

External links 

 
 
 selected poems at recmusic.org
 

1762 births
1834 deaths
Swiss male poets
Swiss nobility
Johann Gaudenz
German male poets
Swiss poets in German
Lyric poets
Johann Gaudenz
Counts de Salis-Soglio and Comtes de Salis-Seewis
19th-century Swiss poets
20th-century Swiss poets
20th-century German male writers
19th-century German male writers